Diablos Rojos (English: Red Devils) may refer to:

 Diablos Rojos de Juliaca, a Peruvian football club
 Diablos Rojos del México, a Mexican baseball team

See also
Red devils